The 2015 CONCACAF Under-20 Championship was an association football tournament that took place from 9 to 24 January 2015 in Jamaica. It determined the four CONCACAF teams that would participate at the 2015 FIFA U-20 World Cup in New Zealand.

Qualification

Note: no titles or runners-up between 1998 and 2007.
Bold indicates that the corresponding team was hosting the event.

Venues
In March 2014, Enrique Sanz invited nations to bid for the hosting rights of the tournament. The deadline for submissions was 14 April 2014. On 23 July, it was announced that Jamaica would be the host nation.

New format

Previously there were four groups of three teams during the group stage of the competition, each team played a minimum of two games and the previous format had a total of 20 matches. For this tournament, there was two groups of six teams, each team played a minimum of five games and the competition had a total of 33 matches. CONCACAF stated that the new format would aid development and competition.

The knockout phase, which included eight matches, comprised four quarter finals, two semi-finals, a third-place playoff and a final games was replaced with two playoff games and a final.

Draw

The draw took place on 30 October at the Hilton Rose Hall Resort in Montego Bay, Jamaica.

On 28 October 2014, CONCACAF announced the procedure of the draw. The 12 teams were divided into three differing pots:

Prior to the draw, hosts Jamaica were assigned to position A1. Teams were grouped according to the order in which they were drawn, the odd numbered drawn teams were assigned a position from Pot A (Group A) and the even numbered draws were assigned a position from Pot B (Group B).

Squads

Only players born on or after 1 January 1995 were eligible to play in the tournament. Each participating national association were required to provide a provisional list of 20-30 players to CONCACAF before 10 December 2014, and a final 20-man selection was required by 30 December 2014.

Group stage
All times local: UTC−05:00.

Group A

Group B

Final stage
In the final stage, if a match was level at the end of normal playing time, extra time was played (two periods of fifteen minutes each) and followed, if necessary, by a penalty shoot-out to determine the winner.

Playoff stage

The second-and third-place teams from each group were re-seeded by group stage results, with the best team facing the fourth-best team, and the second-best team facing the third-best team.

Honduras and the United States qualified to the 2015 FIFA U-20 World Cup.

Final

Both Mexico and Panama qualified to the 2015 FIFA U-20 World Cup.

Awards

Golden Ball
 Luis Pereira

Golden Boot
The award was shared.
 Romain Gall
 Hirving Lozano

Golden Glove
 Jaime De Gracia

Fair Play Award

Best XI
Goalkeeper:  Jaime De Gracia 
Right Defender:  Shaquell Moore 
Central Defender:  Rodrigo González 
Central Defender:  Chin Hormechea 
Left Defender:  Kevin Galván 
Right Midfielder:  Hirving Lozano 
Central Midfielder:  Erick Gutiérrez
Central Midfielder:  Luís Pereira 
Left Midfielder:  Romain Gall 
Forward:  Alejandro Díaz 
Forward:  Ismael Díaz

Top goal scorers
Players with three or more goals:
5 goals
 Hirving Lozano
 Romain Gall
4 goals
 Jonel Désiré
 Alberth Elis
 Bryan Róchez
 Alejandro Díaz
 Ismael Díaz
3 goals
 Jordan Hamilton
 Juan Barahona
 José Villavicencio
 Guillermo Martínez
 José Ramírez

Final ranking

Note: Per statistical convention in football, matches decided in extra time are counted as wins and losses, while matches decided by penalty shoot-out are counted as draws.

References

External links
Under 20s – Men, CONCACAF.com

 
2015
U-20
2015
2015 in youth association football
U-20